Tiến Vình (born 1 October 1920) was a Vietnamese boxer. He competed in the men's bantamweight event at the 1952 Summer Olympics. At the 1952 Summer Olympics, he lost to Angel Figueroa of Puerto Rico.

References

External links
 

1920 births
Possibly living people
Vietnamese male boxers
Olympic boxers of Vietnam
Boxers at the 1952 Summer Olympics
Place of birth missing
Bantamweight boxers